The Altus Independent School District is a school district based in Altus, Oklahoma United States.

See also
List of school districts in Oklahoma

References

External links
 Altus Overview

School districts in Oklahoma
Education in Jackson County, Oklahoma